Route 57 is a name of roads and highways in many countries.

Route 57 may also refer to:

Route 57 (MTA Maryland), a bus route in metropolitan Baltimore, Maryland, U.S.
London Buses route 57, England
Melbourne tram route 57, Australia
National Cycle Route 57, of the National Cycle Network, England
Route 57 (magazine),  an English online literary magazine